John Edward "Jack" Kurkowski (September 28, 1922 – March 14, 2005) was an American football player.  He played college football for the Detroit Titans football team. He led the NCAA major college backs with an average of 10.1 rushing yards per carry during the 1947 season. He ran 80 yards for a touchdown against Duquesne in October 1947.  During his career with the Titans, Kurkowski gained 1,315 yards on 192 carries for an average of 6.9 yards per carry.  In December 1948, Kurkowski signed with the New York Yankees of the All-America Football Conference. He was inducted into the Detroit Titans Hall of Fame in 1982. He lived in Royal Oak, Michigan, for 55 years and died in 2005 at age 82.

References

1922 births
2005 deaths
American football halfbacks
Detroit Titans football players
Players of American football from Detroit